Pat Vaughan is an Irish sportsperson.  He plays hurling with his local club Crusheen and has been a member of the Clare senior inter-county team since 2006.

References

Living people
Crusheen hurlers
Clare inter-county hurlers
Year of birth missing (living people)